The World Is Ours is a 1937 Czech comedy film directed by Martin Frič.

Cast
 George Voskovec as Newspaper hawker (as Jiří Voskovec)
 Jan Werich as Newspaper hawker
 Bohus Záhorský as Dexler
 Vladimír Šmeral as Josef Forman
 Ladislav H. Struna as Holister
 Jaroslav Průcha as Antonín Hart
 Adina Mandlová as Markétka
 Miroslav Svoboda as Berger
 Frantisek Cerný as Bidon
 František Filipovský as Pinker
 Zdeněk Štěpánek as the Governor
 Karel Dostal as Secretary at the Noel's 
 Emanuel Kovarík as an employee at the Noel's
 Jiří Hron as an employee at the Noel's
 Jarmila Svabíková as Workwoman at the Noel's
 Mirko Eliás as Workman at the Noel's

References

External links
 

1937 films
1937 comedy films
1930s Czech-language films
Czechoslovak black-and-white films
Films directed by Martin Frič
Czechoslovak comedy films
1930s Czech films